William Leonard Pereira (April 25, 1909 – November 13, 1985) was an American architect from Chicago, Illinois, who was noted for his futuristic designs of landmark buildings such as the Transamerica Pyramid in San Francisco. Remarkably prolific, he worked out of Los Angeles, and was known for his love of science fiction and expensive cars, but mostly for his unmistakable style of architecture, which helped define the look of mid-20th century America.

Personal life
Pereira was born in Chicago, Illinois, the son of Sarah (Friedberg) and Saul Pereira. His paternal grandfather was of Portuguese Sephardi Jewish ancestry, and his other grandparents were Ashkenazi Jews. Pereira graduated from the School of Architecture, University of Illinois and began his career in his home city. He had some of his earliest architectural experience helping to draft the master plan for the 1933 "A Century of Progress" Chicago World's Fair. With his brother, Hal Pereira, he designed the Esquire Theater at 58 East Oak Street, considered one of Chicago's best examples of Art Deco style.

He had two wives, former model and actress Margaret McConnell (1910-2011, married June 24, 1934) and Bronya Galef; the latter marriage ending with his death. He has a son, William Pereira, Jr., and a daughter, Monica Pereira, a Spanish teacher.

In stark contrast to his famous modernist design sensibilities, Bill Pereira once practiced out of a small collection of rustic looking offices on the site of what was then known as the ‘Buffalo Ranch,’ part of the much larger Irvine Ranch, two miles from where the UCI campus stands today, in Corona Del Mar/Newport Beach. He chose to live in the beautiful Emerald Bay community in north Laguna Beach, and in later life always considered Laguna as his home town.

William Pereira died of cancer at age 76 at Cedars-Sinai Medical Center in Los Angeles. At his request, no funeral services were planned.

Career

Pereira moved to Los Angeles in 1933, and Hal also relocated there in that decade. After working as a solo architect, Pereira was hired by the Motion Picture Relief Fund and designed the first buildings for the Motion Picture Country House in Woodland Hills, California, which was dedicated September 27, 1942.

Pereira also had a brief stint as a Hollywood art director. He shared an Academy Award for Best Special Effects for the action/adventure film Reap the Wild Wind (1942). He was the art director for "This Gun for Hire", Alan Ladd's first film.  He was production designer of the drama Jane Eyre (1943), and of the war drama Since You Went Away (1944). Pereira was also the producer of the noir crime/drama Johnny Angel (1945), and of the Joan Fontaine drama From This Day Forward (1946).

In 1949, Pereira became a professor of architecture at the University of Southern California. He then formed a partnership with fellow architect and classmate, Charles Luckman, in the early 1950s. The firm, Pereira & Luckman, grew into one of the nation's busiest. The duo designed some of Los Angeles's most well-known buildings, including the famed "Theme Building" at Los Angeles International Airport (in collaboration with Paul Williams and Welton Becket).

He parted with Luckman in 1959. Afterward, he formed the third and final company of his career, "William L. Pereira & Associates." In the 1960s and 1970s, he and his team completed over 250 projects, including drawing up the master plans for the Los Angeles International Airport expansion and developing the master plan for the  city of Irvine, California, which put his photograph on the cover of Time Magazine in September 1963. He later worked with Ian McHarg on the plan for the new town of The Woodlands, Texas. Pereira also designed the campus plans of the University of Southern California, the University of California, Irvine, and Pepperdine University.

His firm's designs varied greatly, but had many common design hallmarks, such as porous lattice-like facades, twinned vertical columns, elevated causeways, recessed windows, and perhaps most distinctly, a liberal use of lampposts, often custom designed. Many of his buildings were complemented by expansive water features. A pioneer in the design of heat-efficient buildings, he often employed concrete façade systems that shaded the windows, which were typically of bronze reflective glass, from direct sunlight.

According to Pereira's daughter, Monica, one of his favorite buildings of his own was the complex he designed for the Municipal Water District in Los Angeles in 1963.

Legacy

By the time of his death, Pereira had over 400 projects to his name. Among the structures he designed throughout Southern California were CBS Television City, Fox Plaza, the Los Angeles County Art Museum, the Howard Johnson Hotel and Water Playground in Anaheim, and the Disneyland Hotel in Anaheim. He is also responsible for creating the monumental Spanish-inspired facades that defined Robinson's department stores for nearly 20 years, and he was the architect of Pepperdine University at Malibu, named by the Princeton Review as the most beautiful college campus in America.

His most praised and criticized work was probably the Transamerica building, which was completed in 1972. When the building was first unveiled in 1969 it was met with harsh criticism, but has been accepted as having more character than the buildings around it and as being an oddly creative city symbol.

Perhaps his greatest lasting legacy besides his buildings are the numerous respected architects of today who came out of both Pereira's firm and the classes he taught at USC, including Gin Wong and Frank Gehry.  Pereira's firm was taken over upon his death by his two primary cohorts, Scott Johnson and Bill Fain.

See also
List of William Pereira buildings

References

External links

 
Modernist architects from the United States
Postmodern architects
American urban planners
Architectural theoreticians
American production designers
1909 births
1985 deaths
Artists from Chicago
Architects from Los Angeles
American people of Azorean descent
American people of Portuguese-Jewish descent
Jewish architects
Best Visual Effects Academy Award winners
Fellows of the American Institute of Architects
People associated with the Los Angeles County Museum of Art
University of Illinois alumni
University of Southern California faculty
Deaths from cancer in California
20th-century American architects
University of Illinois School of Architecture alumni
American people of Portuguese descent